Kamensk-Uralsky is a city in Sverdlovsk Oblast, Russia, located at the confluence of the Kamenka and Iset Rivers (Ob's basin). Population:    173,000 (1972); 51,000 (1939).

History
Kamensky Zavod was founded in the late 17th century as a settlement next to the cast iron smelting factory and foundry, commissioned on October 15, 1701. For the first two centuries of existence it was known for its cannons.

First schools opened in Kamensk in 1724. The cast iron smelting factory was rebuilt in 1825–1829. Railway traffic started on December 6, 1885. The first library opened in 1899. In 1934, Sinarsky Pipe Works was established. In 1939, Ural Aluminum Factory was established.

Kamensk was granted city status in 1935 and renamed Kamensk-Uralsky in 1940.

Administrative and municipal status
Within the framework of the administrative divisions, Kamensk-Uralsky serves as the administrative center of Kamensky District, even though it is not a part of it. As an administrative division, it is, together with six rural localities, incorporated separately as the City of Kamensk-Uralsky—an administrative unit with the status equal to that of the districts. As a municipal division, the City of Kamensk-Uralsky is incorporated as Kamensk-Uralsky Urban Okrug.

Economy
Kamensk-Uralsky is one of the fastest-growing cities in the oblast. Industrial production includes: fuel-energy and metallurgical complex, machinery construction, electronics (semiconductors and computers), light and food industry, transport and communication.

The most developed industry is metallurgical production, particularly non-ferrous metallurgy, which occupies 69% of the total volume of industrial production of the city and 12.9% of the oblast.

Main businesses
Four main companies (Sinarsky Pipe Works, Kamensk-Uralsky Metallurgical Works, SUAL-UAZ and Oktyabr Factory) account for 75% of the total value of industrial production.

Sinarsky Pipe Works
SinTZ, a producer of steel, stainless steel and cast iron pipes, is recognized as one of the "G-7" among the biggest specialized plants in Russia. The annual number of contracts entered for manufacture and shipment amounts to over three thousand, covering more than 12 thousand items.  SinTZ products are widely used in oil and gas production works, machine-building plants, power plants and many other construction and public services organizations.
The Sinarsky Pipe Works is a modern, reliable, dynamic and developing enterprise.

Kamensk-Uralsky Metallurgical Works (KUMZ)

KUMZ was founded as a special metallurgy mill belonging to the Ministry of Aircraft Industry for providing aircraft construction with semi-finished products made of aluminum and magnesium alloys. Building of the first mill stage was accomplished in 1944.

In 1945-1992 the mill has become one of the leading enterprises of the special metallurgy. Restructuring and diversification  enabled the company to liquidate unprofitable production lines, master output new kinds of products, come to foreign markets, and significantly increase the mill's efficiency. In April 2000, KUMZ joined Russian Association of Metal Traders (RAMT).

 KLUZ Iset Arus , Uralelektromash , Uraltehmash

Culture and education
There are 123 different cultural establishments in Kamensk-Uralsky: 10 educational institutions (4 music schools, 4 schools of art, 2 schools of drawing); 90 public libraries; 5 theaters; 11 clubs; 2 movie theaters.

There are branches of the Ural State Technical University, the Ural State University of Economics, and of the Ural Institute of Economics, Management, and Law in the city.

Tourism

Kamensk-Uralsky is one of the historical cities of Russia.

Well known sights of Kamensk-Uralsky include:
monument the Cannon - symbol of the city (sculptor Permyakov V.V., 1967),
the Stone Gates (limestone rock, landmark of regional value),
unique project Railway bridge over Iset river (Rosnovsky V.A., 1939, 140 m arch bridge of steel tubes filled with concrete),
the Building of administration of the State iron foundry (architect Malakhov M.P., 19th century).
36 Krasnykh Orlov Street (19th century).

City traditions

Ice (snow) Towns. on the eve of New Year city companies build small towns of ice and snow. These towns include ice-hills, snow and ice figures of fairy tales characters, Chinese zodiac animal, Ded Moroz and Snegurochka. Towns are embellished with New Year's trees and garlands with hundreds of colored bulbs. This tradition is more than thirty years old. Ordinary main pretenders to the name of the best Ice Town are Central Town (built on the funds of Kamensk-Uralsky administration), Chkalovsky Town (KUMZ) and Trubniy Town (SinTZ).
Festival Kamensk-Uralsky – Bell Capital. This is all-Russian festival of the best bell ringers. Ringers exchange with experience, master classes take place during this time. First festival was conducted in 2005. It is a joint project of Kamensk-Uralsky administration and well-known bells manufacture, situated in the city, "Pyatkov and Co"
Carnival (during celebration of City's Day). It is a procession in fancy-dresses to the central square of the city. Kamensk-Uralsky City's Day coincides with the Day of Metallurgist in Russia. It takes place on third Saturday of July. First Carnival was conducted on July 15, 2000.

Aeronautics

Most festivities are accompanied with flights of hot air balloon, which is aviated by members of local aeronautics club and guests. First free flight of Kamensk balloon was performed on 22 July 2009. Development of aeronautics in the city allows to take pleasure of bird's-eye view of pictorial surroundings.

Notable people
Famous people born, lived or worked in Kamensk-Uralsky

Mikhail Pavlovich Malakhov, architect
Sergey Prokudin-Gorsky, chemist and photographer
Alexander Karpinsky, geologist and mineralogist
Pavel Belyayev, cosmonaut
Vera Mukhina, sculptor

See also
Architectural complex “Socgorod Trubnyi”, Kamensk-Uralsky
Kamensk-Uralsky (air base)

External links

Official website of Kamensk-Uralsky 
Kamensk-Uralsky Business Directory 
KUMZ official site

References

 
Cities and towns in Sverdlovsk Oblast
Kamyshlovsky Uyezd
Monotowns in Russia